Avenue Mohammed VI is the name of thoroughfares in numerous Moroccan cities, honoring king Mohammed VI of Morocco:

 Avenue Mohammed VI, Marrakesh
 Avenue Mohammed VI, see Academy of the Kingdom of Morocco, Rabat
 Mohammed VI Avenue, see Tangier City Center

See also
 Avenue Mohammed V (disambiguation)